Phil Stacey is the self-titled debut studio album by American country music singer Phil Stacey, released on April 29, 2008 on Lyric Street Records.

The album debuted on the Billboard 200 at No. 43 with 13,000 sold for the week. IT has sold 40,000 copies as of March 2009. Its only single, "If You Didn't Love Me", charted on the Billboard Hot Country Songs charts at number 28.

The track "'Round Here" was co-written by the four members of the group Little Big Town, along with Wayne Kirkpatrick, who produces for both Little Big Town and for Stacey.

Track listing

Personnel
J. T. Corenflos – electric guitar
Dan Dugmore – pedal steel guitar
Stuart Duncan – fiddle
Shannon Forrest – drums
Mark Hill – bass guitar
Troy Johnson – background vocals
Gordon Kennedy – electric guitar
Kirk Kirkland – background vocals
Wayne Kirkpatrick – acoustic guitar, banjo, Dobro, piano, tambourine, melodica, mando-guitar, National steel guitar, background vocals
Randy Kohrs – Dobro
Tom Lane – background vocals
Phil Madiera – Hammond organ
Blair Masters – piano, keyboards
Chris McHugh – drums
Cindy Morgan – background vocals
Jimmy Nichols – piano
Kip Raines – background vocals
Jimmie Lee Sloas – bass guitar
Phil Stacey – lead vocals
David Zaffiro – electric guitar

Chart performance

References

2008 debut albums
Lyric Street Records albums
Phil Stacey albums